The discography of Japanese singer-songwriter Gen Hoshino consists of five studio albums, five video albums, 15 singles and 17 music videos. Hoshino debuted as the leader and guitarist of the instrumental band Sakerock, and released his first solo album, Baka no Uta (2010), under the label Victor Entertainment. He gained nationwide recognition with the single "Sun" (2015), his first single to receive a certification by the Recording Industry Association of Japan (RIAJ). The same year, Hoshino's fourth album, Yellow Dancer, became his first number one album in Japan. His song "Koi" (2016), the theme song for the drama The Full-Time Wife Escapist, became the most downloaded song in Japan in 2017, and was certified Million for digital downloads by the RIAJ.

Studio albums

Extended plays

Singles

As lead artist

As featured artist

Promotional singles

Other charted songs

Other appearances

Videography

Video albums

Music videos

See also 
Sakerock discography

References
Notes

Sources

Discographies of Japanese artists
Pop music discographies